was an ace fighter pilot in the Imperial Japanese Navy (IJN) during the Pacific theater of World War II. In aerial combat over the Pacific, he was officially credited with five solo victories, five joint victories, and two probables.

As a member of the Kanoya and 253 Air Groups based at Rabaul, Abe participated in aerial combat with Allied forces during the Solomon Islands and New Guinea campaigns in 1942 and 1943. Abe was injured on 6 May 1943 and returned to Japan to recuperate. Abe was still recuperating when the war ended in August 1945.

References

1923 births
Year of death missing
Japanese naval aviators
Japanese World War II flying aces
Military personnel from Ōita Prefecture